Highway 1, most widely known as the Pan-American Highway, is the most important highway in Peru, forming part of the larger Pan-American Highway.

Route

Northern Highway
This road is the Peruvian portion of the Pan-American Highway. It runs north–south through the whole length of the country and connects all major cities in the country's coastal area. The northern terminus of the highway is located in the Macará International Bridge (Piura Region) at the border with Ecuador. Starting in this point, the highway is known as Carretera Panamericana Norte ("North Pan-American Highway").

Lima
The highway crosses coastal and central Lima, the country's capital. Once it reaches a roundabout in Santa Anita, the Northern part of the highway stops. Going south from this point, the highway is called Carretera Panamericana Sur ("South Pan-American Highway").

The section between Caquetá (Habich, according to the concessionaire) and Javier Prado avenues is called the Vía de Evitamiento and is licensed to Lima Expresa, from the French group Vinci SA.

Southern Highway
The Southern part of the highway continues from the roundabout in Lima until it reaches the southern terminus, located in the Santa Rosa Border Post, in the Tacna Region at the border with Chile.

See also
Carretera Central

References

Highways in Peru
Pan-American Highway